Arta is a genus of snout moths. It was described by Augustus Radcliffe Grote in 1875.

Species
 Arta bichordalis Ragonot, 1891
 Arta brevivalvalis Cashatt, 1968
 Arta calidalis Hampson, 1906
 Arta encaustalis Ragonot, 1891
 Arta epicoenalis Ragonot, 1891
 Arta serialis Hampson, 1897
 Arta statalis Grote, 1875
 Arta olivalis Grote, 1878

References

Chrysauginae
Pyralidae genera